Herbert Lindinger (born 3 December 1933 in Wels) is an Austrian graphic artist, exhibition designer, industrial designer, and university professor. He is known for designing trains and trams such as the S-DT8.12 Stuttgart light rail cars, and the TW 6000 and TW 2000 (with Jasper Morrison) for the city of Hanover, Germany, as well as the associated urban furniture and infrastructure. The logo of the University of Hannover, which evokes Leibniz's exploration of the binary number system, was also designed by Lindinger.

Early life and education 
Lindinger was born in Wels, Austria in 1933. He studied graphic and exhibition design in Linz from 1950 to 1954, and subsequently studied product design at the Hochschule für Gestaltung (HfG) from 1954 to 58, where he was a student of Josef Albers, Johannes Itten, Max Bill, Friedrich Vordemberge-Gildewart, Tomas Maldonado, and Hans Gugelot.

Work and career 

In the 1950s he worked alongside Hans Gugelot and Dieter Rams designing audio equipment for Braun.

He was a lecturer at the Ulm School of Design (HfG) from 1963 to 1968, and subsequently, from 1971 to 1998, a professor and Director of the Institute for Industrial Design at the University of Hanover.

A 2017 German postage stamp honouring "Design from Germany" features Lindinger and his design for the Stuttgart light rail cars.

In 2022, a German court ruled that Lindinger's design of the fabric used for the seat covers of the city’s public transport system was protected by copyright. As a result, the public transportation company BVG was temporarily barred from selling products and merchandise (including tea towels to sneakers) using the popular design. Bloomberg noted that "While it has been resolved amicably, the fight reveals how passionate people can get about public transit seat covers — designs that many of us see every day, but which very often fall far outside the boundaries of conventional good taste." A settlement was letter reached.

Publications

References

External links 
 
 
 
 

Living people
1933 births
German designers
Austrian designers
Industrial designers
Industrial design
Design